Plasmodium pifanoi is a parasite of the genus Plasmodium subgenus Paraplasmodium. As in all Plasmodium species, P. pifanoi has both vertebrate and insect hosts. The vertebrate hosts for this parasite are lizards.

Taxonomy 
This species was first described by Scorza and Dagert in 1956. It was redescribed in 2003 by Telford.

Description 
The asexual stages are irregular in shape and do not have a vacuole.

Schizonts measure 6.2 × 4.5 micrometres (range: 4 – 8 × 3 – 6) and produce on average 11.9 (range: 7 – 16) merozoites.

Gametocytes average 12.4 × 6.0  micrometres (range: 8 – 16 × 4 – 10). The average length × width product is 72.9 (range: 52 – 112) and the average length / width ratio is 2.18 (range: 1.1 – 3.3). The gametocytes always contain 1 – 5 prominent vacuoles.

Macrogametocytes during active infection are longer than microgametocytes with a greater length-width product. Gametocytes in chronic infection are slightly smaller and are not sexually dimorphic in their dimensions.

Distribution 
Found in Venezuela, South America.

Hosts 
Known hosts are the lizards Ameiva ameiva and Kentropyx calcarata.

References 

pifanoi